Myrmecophilus acervorum is an orthopteran insect belonging to the family Myrmecophilidae (the ant-loving crickets). This continental European species is probably the most widespread and most frequently encountered member of this rather obscure family found in Europe. It is also by far the smallest orthopteran found in Western Europe, with its total adult length never exceeding .

As with other members of the family, this insect lives its whole lifecycle as an inquiline within ants' nests. M. acervorum is known to live with more than 20 different ant species. This specialized way of life has led this insect and its relatives to evolve many morphological differences compared to other orthopterans, including complete absence of wings (as they never leave their host nest) and hearing organs (as they no longer use stridulation), and much reduced eyesight, as well as their very small size.

These tiny insects are dark brown with paler bands and prominent cerci, which serve as their primary sensory organs. Adults are found throughout the year, and take up to two years to reach adulthood from hatching. In this species,  the females reproduce parthenogenetically.

References

External links
Myrmecophilus.de

Ensifera
Insects described in 1799
Orthoptera of Europe
Taxa named by Georg Wolfgang Franz Panzer